Reaction is the second album by American R&B singer Rebbie Jackson. The album was released on October 7, 1986 and spawned two mildly successful singles, "Reaction" and "You Send the Rain Away", a duet with Robin Zander. "Ticket To Love" was going to be released as the second single and received a very limited promo release before being cancelled in favour of "You Send the Rain Away". The album-only track "Tonight I'm Yours", a duet with Isaac Hayes, received substantial airplay but was not commercially released as a single.

Reaction received a limited CD reissue in Japan in the early 1990s. It was reissued on CD with Jackson's previous album Centipede on May 18, 2010. The album was reissued by Funky Town Grooves on CD in October 2012 and included 7 bonus tracks.

Track listing
"Reaction" (David Conley, David Townsend, Bernard Jackson) – 5:39
"Ain't No Way to Love" (Robert Brookins, Tony Haynes, Philip Bailey) – 4:15
"Ticket to Love" (Erik Nuri) – 4:48
"You Don't Know What You're Missing" (Howie Rice, Allan D. Rich, Barry Fasman) – 3:51
"You Send the Rain Away" (with Robin Zander) (Preston Glass, Gloria Sklerov, Lenny Macaluso) – 4:59
"If You Don't Call (You Don't Care)" (Erik Nuri, Patrick Henderson) – 5:11
"Always Wanting Something" (Tito Jackson, Vassal Benford) – 4:27
"Tonight I'm Yours" (with Isaac Hayes) (Vassal Benford, Rebbie Jackson, Lanar Brantley) – 4:16
"Lessons (In the Fine Art of Love)" (Reggie Lucas, Leslie Lynne Smith) – 4:37

2012 Expanded edition

Charts

Sources

1986 albums
Rebbie Jackson albums
Columbia Records albums